Hephthocara is a small genus of Indo-Pacific viviparous brotula.

Species
There are currently two recognized species in this genus:
 Hephthocara crassiceps H. M. Smith & Radcliffe, 1913
 Hephthocara simum Alcock, 1892

References

Bythitidae